Legal gender, or legal sex, is a sex or gender that is recognized under the law. Biological sex, sex reassignment and gender identity are used to determine legal gender. The details vary by jurisdiction.

History 
In European societies, Roman law, post-classical canon law, and later common law, referred to a person's sex as male, female or hermaphrodite, with legal rights as male or female depending on the characteristics that appeared most dominant. Under Roman law, a hermaphrodite had to be classed as either male or female. The 12th-century Decretum Gratiani states that "Whether an hermaphrodite may witness a testament, depends on which sex prevails". The foundation of common law, the 16th Century Institutes of the Lawes of England, described how a hermaphrodite could inherit "either as male or female, according to that kind of sexe which doth prevaile." Legal cases where legal sex was placed in doubt have been described over the centuries.

In 1930, Lili Elbe received emasculation and ovary transplant and changed her legal gender as female. In 1931, Dora Richter received removal of the penis and vaginoplasty. A few weeks after Lili Elbe had her final surgery including uterus transplant and vaginoplasty. Immune rejection from transplanted uterus caused her death. In May 1933, Institute for Sexual Research was attacked by Nazi and there are no record about Richter after this attack.

After World War II, transgender issues received public attention again. Christine Jorgensen was unable to marry man because her birth certificate listed her as male. Some transsexuals changed their birth certificates, but its validity were challenged. In United Kingdom, Sir Ewan Forbes, 11th Baronet case recognized legal gender change of intersex person. However legal gender change of transsexuals were not recognized in Corbett v Corbett.

Nowadays, many jurisdictions allow transgender individuals to change their legal gender. However there are some obstacles. Some jurisdictions require sterilization, childlessness or unmarried status for legal gender change.

In some cases, legal gender of transsexual's who did not revised public documents yet become problems. In some cases, courts accept their gender identity if they received sex reassignment surgery.

Growing intersex awareness movements or non-binary movements caused legal recognition of non-binary gender for some jurisdictions.

Present views

See also 
 Same-sex marriage
 Sex
 Gender identity
 Gender Recognition Act (Norway)
 Gender Recognition Panel
 Legal status of transgender people
 Sex assignment
 Sex reassignment surgery
 LGBT rights by country or territory
 Transgender marriage

References

Gender
Transgender law